Chiara Dall'Ora (born ) is a retired Italian female volleyball player, playing as a middle blocker. She was part of the Italy women's national volleyball team.

She won the bronze medal at the 2005 Mediterranean Games. On club level she played for VC Padova in 2005.

References

External links
 

1983 births
Living people
Italian women's volleyball players
Place of birth missing (living people)
Mediterranean Games bronze medalists for Italy
Mediterranean Games medalists in volleyball
Competitors at the 2005 Mediterranean Games
20th-century Italian women
21st-century Italian women